The conquest of New Netherland occurred in 1664 as an English expedition led by Richard Nicolls that arrived in New York Harbor effected a peaceful capture of New Amsterdam, and the Articles of Surrender of New Netherland were agreed. The conquest was mostly peaceful in the rest of the colony as well, except for some fighting in New Amstel.

Background

The commercial rivalry between the Dutch and the English, which provoked the First Anglo-Dutch War was not resolved by the Treaty of Westminster (1654). Hostilities continued between the countries' trading companies. Religious and political differences between the Anglican royalists in England and the Calvinist republicans that ruled the Netherlands also hampered peace. During the Anglo-Spanish War of 1654–1660, Dutch traders supplanted the English in trade with Spain and its possessions in Italy and America. 

Conflict developed between the States of Holland and Charles II of England's sister Mary, the widowed Princess of Orange, over the education and future prospects of her son William III of Orange. Charles was influenced by his brother James and Henry Bennet, 1st Earl of Arlington as he sought a popular and lucrative foreign war at sea to bolster his authority as king.  Many naval officers welcomed the prospect of a conflict with the Dutch.

In the year before the invasion, Captain John Scott harassed several Dutch settlements on Long Island.

Conquest of New Amsterdam

In March 1664, Charles granted American territory between the Delaware and Connecticut rivers to James. On May 25, 1664 Colonel Richard Nicolls set out from Portsmouth with four warships and about three hundred soldiers. They arrived at Gravesend Bay on Long Island on August 27 and enlisted the support of militias from the English towns there as they moved west to Breuckelen. Nichols sent director-general Peter Stuyvesant a letter offering lenient terms of surrender. James authorized generous terms because he preferred the profits of an intact colony to the spoils of a ruined one. Despite Fort Amsterdam's limited supply of gunpowder, Stuyvesant was inclined to resist. On September 4, the English ships began to maneuver closer to the fort. Stuyvesant was confronted by ninety-three burghers and his own son, and conceded.

A group of prominent merchants then met at Stuyvesant Farm with Nicholls' officers to draft Articles of Capitulation. The Dutch colonists were guaranteed in the possession of their property rights, their laws of inheritance, and the enjoyment of religious freedom. Article 2 specified that all "publick houses" would remain open. The Articles were signed on September 6, 1664 onboard ship by Johannes de Decker, Stuyvesant's lawyer and chief negotiator. The following day being Sunday the transfer did not take place until September 8 when the Dutch forces marched down Beaver Street and embarked on board the Gideon bound for Holland, and Nicolls assumed the position of deputy-governor.

Surrender of Fort Orange

On September 10, Johannes de Decker sailed north to Fort Orange to warn them the English were coming and to rally opposition. Nicholls sent troops to demand the fort's peaceful surrender. Realizing that control of the mouth of the river, controlled the settlement's future, on September 24, 1664 that vice-director of New Netherland Johannes de Montagne surrendered the fort to the English, and Colonel George Cartwright took command. The next day, Captain John Manning was given charge of the fort, which was renamed Fort Albany, after the Duke of York's title in the Peerage of Scotland. While he was there, Cartwright renewed the Dutch treaty with the Iroquois.

On his way back down river, Cartwright landed at Esopus and the settlement surrendered without resistance. Cartwright took the same precautions as at Albany to conciliate the residents and left the local Dutch officials to continue in power. A garrison of regular soldiers was placed in charge of the fort under the command of Captain Daniel Brodhead of the grenadiers. Brodhead and his wife settled in the area; his grandson, Daniel Brodhead II, founded Dansbury, Pennsylvania.

Capture of New Amstel

Around the same time that Nicholls sent Cartwright north to Fort Orange, he dispatched Sir Robert Carr, a relative of the Earl of Arlington, south to the territory the Dutch had previously seized from Sweden. The English took Fort Altena peacefully. Alexander D’Hinoyossa director of New Amstel retreated with some followers to Fort Casimir. Carr fired two broadsides into the fort, then took it by storm. His soldiers then pillaged the surrounding settlements, even though the residents had made no resistance. He seized property, harvests, some 200 sheep, horses, and cows, destroyed a brewery, and a sawmill. He then proceeded further south and plundered Pieter Corneliszoon Plockhoy's Mennonite settlement near present day Lewes, Delaware. Carr handed over Dutch soldiers to the merchantman as payment for services rendered and they were subsequently transported to Virginia to be sold. 

Carr's behavior angered Nicholls, whose policy had been to avoid conflict between the settlers and the new government. He was also outraged that Carr looked to profit from his  excesses while the soldiers were in need, He visited New Amstel, renamed it New Castle, and appointed a new commander, but was unable to compel Carr to give up any of his spoils, and returned to New York without him.

References

1664 in North America
Anglo-Dutch Wars
Conflicts in 1664
1664 in the Dutch Empire
1664 in the Province of New York
Military history of Delaware
Military history of New Jersey
Military history of New York (state)
New Netherland
Second Anglo-Dutch War